Strelitzia  is a genus of five species of perennial plants, native to South Africa. It belongs to the plant family Strelitziaceae. A common name of the genus is bird of paradise flower/plant, because of a resemblance of its flowers to birds-of-paradise. In South Africa, it is commonly known as a crane flower.

Two of the species, S. nicolai and S. reginae, are frequently grown as houseplants. It is the floral emblem of the City of Los Angeles and is featured on the reverse of the 50-cent coin.

Taxonomy 
The genus was named by Joseph Banks in honour of Queen Charlotte, wife of George III who was born a princess of the house of Mecklenburg-Strelitz.

Description 
The species S. nicolai is the largest in the genus, reaching 10 m (33 ft) tall, with stately white and blue flowers; the other species typically reach 2.0 to 3.5 m tall, except S. caudata, which is a tree of a typically smaller size than S. nicolai.

The leaves are large, 30–200 cm long and 10–80 cm broad, similar to a banana leaf in appearance, but with a longer petiole, and arranged strictly in two ranks to form a fan-like crown of evergreen foliage.

The flowers are produced in a horizontal inflorescence emerging from a stout spathe.

Biology and propagation 
They are pollinated by sunbirds, which perch on and drink from the spathe. The weight of the bird when standing on the spathe opens it to release the pollen onto the bird's feet, which is then deposited on the next spathe it visits. Strelitzia species lack natural insect pollinators; in areas without sunbirds, plants in this genus generally need hand pollination to successfully set seed.

Species and hybrids
Five species are recognised, although one—S. juncea—has been shown to be genetically nested within another, S. reginae. It is possibly a mutation that is in the process of speciating. 

Strelitzia × kewensis (hybrid between S. reginae and S. augusta)

Allergenicity
Plants in the genus Strelitzia  produce no wind-borne pollen, and have an OPALS allergy scale rating of 1, meaning a very low risk of causing allergic reaction.

Symbolism 
Strelitzia's flower language has many meanings, including success, freedom, immortality, loyalty, love, thoughtfulness and optimism. It is also a symbol of the 9th wedding anniversary
Freedom - Strelitzia symbolizes freedom and overcoming difficulties, reminding people not to stick to the present, but to see a wider world

Loyalty - Strelitzia symbolizes loyalty to a lover, and people present Strelitzia to their partners on the 9th anniversary of marriage to express their wholeheartedness

Optimism - Strelitzia chinensis symbolizes optimism and positive energy, and inspires people not to give up when they are in trouble

Success - Strelitzia is a symbol of success in life and is given when congratulating someone on an important moment in life such as graduating from college

Journal
Strelitzia is also the name of the botanic journal of the Pretoria-based National Botanical Institute, which has since been converted into the South African National Biodiversity Institute (SANBI). The Strelitzia journal replaced Memoirs of the Botanical Survey of South Africa and 'Annals of the Kirstenbosch Botanic Gardens.

References

External links 
 

Strelitziaceae
Zingiberales genera
Taxa named by Joseph Banks